Vaughn Lusby (born August 23, 1956) is a former American football defensive back. He played for the Cincinnati Bengals in 1979 and for the Chicago Bears in 1980.

References

1956 births
Living people
American football defensive backs
Arkansas Razorbacks football players
Cincinnati Bengals players
Chicago Bears players